'Detroit Red' is a variable apple cultivar, possibly the same as 'Detroit Black', that gives fruit of mediocre quality, somewhat unreliably or biennially. It was grown at Monticello by Thomas Jefferson.

References

Apple cultivars